Cragia is a genus of moths in the subfamily Arctiinae.

Species
 Cragia adiastola Kiriakoff, 1958
 Cragia distigmata (Hampson, 1901)
 Cragia quadrinotata (Walker, 1864)

References

External links
Natural History Museum Lepidoptera generic names catalog

Lithosiini